Whitney is an unincorporated community in Placer County, California.

The name honors a local rancher, Joel Parker Whitney.

Whitney's Pyramid Tomb is located in Rocklin, California

References

 List of pyramid mausoleums in North America

Unincorporated communities in California
Unincorporated communities in Placer County, California